John Willoughby Dixie Smith (11 March 1882 – 2 October 1959) was an English cricketer and rugby union player. Smith was a utility back in rugby and right-handed batsman in cricket, although his bowling style is unknown. He was born at Blaby, Leicestershire. He was also known as John Willoughby Dixie-Smith.

School and rugby
Smith attended Oundle School in Northamptonshire in 1897 and 1898. On 20 January 1902 he made his debut for Leicester Tigers against Plymouth, scoring a try in a 5–3 defeat. Smith played against Exeter the next day, but did not feature again that season. He featured regularly in the 1903–04 & 1904–05 seasons before leaving the club for two seasons.  He re-joined in 1907 and played most weeks, in 1908–09 he played in 36 games, the most of any of his seasons and captained the club on 3 occasions.  He played his final match on 2 March 1912 against Headingly.

World War 1 and cricket
He later served in World War I with the Leicestershire Regiment, where he held the rank of Lieutenant. Following the war, Smith made two first-class appearances for Leicestershire in the 1921 County Championship against Gloucestershire and Glamorgan. He scored 30 runs in his two matches with a high score of 25 and a batting average of 7.50.

He died at Harrow on the Hill, Middlesex on 2 October 1959.

References

External links
John Smith at ESPNcricinfo
John Smith at CricketArchive

1882 births
1959 deaths
Rugby union players from Blaby
Cricketers from Leicestershire
People educated at Oundle School
English cricketers
Leicestershire cricketers
British Army personnel of World War I
Royal Leicestershire Regiment officers
Military personnel from Leicestershire
Leicester Tigers players